KLWT (1230 AM) was a radio station broadcasting a news talk information format. Licensed to Lebanon, Missouri, United States, the station was owned by Go Productions LLC and featured programming from Salem Radio Network.

Go Productions surrendered the station's license to the Federal Communications Commission (FCC) on October 17, 2016; the FCC cancelled KLWT's license and deleted its call sign on November 9, 2016.

Notable staff
 Jim Bohannon - Radio talk show host (retired October 14, 2022), member of the National Radio Hall of Fame. His career began at KLWT while a teenager growing up in Lebanon.

References

External link
FCC Station Search Details: DKLWT (Facility ID: 36876)

LWT
News and talk radio stations in the United States
Radio stations established in 1964
1964 establishments in Missouri
Defunct radio stations in the United States
Radio stations disestablished in 2016
2016 disestablishments in Missouri
LWT